Sao Hkun Hkio (19 August 1912 – 21 October 1990) was a Burmese political figure and diplomat who served as acting Foreign Minister of Myanmar in 1948, 4th Foreign Minister of Myanmar (1950-1958, & 1960-1962) as well as Deputy Prime Minister of Burma in the era of 1st Prime Minister of Burma U Nu. He was known for being the longest serving Foreign Minister of Myanmar. He additionally served as the last Saopha of Möngmit from 1936 to 1952. His elder brother-in-law, Sao San Tun was the Saopha of Mongpawn who was assassinated along with General Aung San, father of modern-day Burma who served as 5th Premier of British Burma Crown Colony from 26 September 1946 to 19 July 1947.

Career information

Personal life
He notably received his education at Framlingham College and got BA degree in 1934 from the University of Cambridge in the United Kingdom, reportedly meeting his wife Beatrice Mabel Hkio while dog-walking on Parker's Piece.

He had 4 children, 2 boys and 2 girls, all of which grew up and lived in England.

References

Alumni of Magdalene College, Cambridge
Alumni of the University of Cambridge
1912 births
1990 deaths
Deputy Prime Ministers of Myanmar
Foreign ministers of Myanmar
Government ministers of Myanmar
People from Shan State
Burmese people of World War II